Fyan is a surname of Irish origin. Notable people with the surname include:

 Loleta Fyan (1894–1990), American librarian
 Robert Washington Fyan (1835–1896), American politician and soldier

See also
 Fyans
 Ryan (surname)

Surnames of Irish origin
Anglicised Irish-language surnames